Abelam (or Ambulas, Abulas) is the most prevalent of the Ndu languages of Sepik River region of northern Papua New Guinea. Dialects are Maprik, Wingei, Wosera-Kamu, Wosera-Mamu.

Phonology

[i, u] may be heard as a realization of the sequences /əj/, /əw/ or resulting in syllabic forms of /j, w/.

References

External links
OLAC resources in and about the Ambulas language
Anthony Forge Films and Recordings From the Anthony Forge Papers. MSS 411. Special Collections & Archives, UC San Diego.

Languages of East Sepik Province
Ndu languages